John Wolward MA (d. 1598) was a Canon of Windsor from 1574 to 1598

Career

He was educated at Eton College and King's College, Cambridge where he graduated BA in 1561 and MA in 1564.

He was appointed:
Conduct-Fellow of Eton College 1565
Rector of Puttenham, Surrey 1567 - 1598
Prebendary of Rochester 1575 - 1585
Rector of Windlesham, Surrey 1588

He was appointed to the eighth stall in St George's Chapel, Windsor Castle in 1574 and held the canonry until 1598.

Notes 

1598 deaths
Canons of Windsor
Alumni of King's College, Cambridge
Fellows of Eton College
People educated at Eton College
Year of birth unknown